South Fork Cross Creek is a  long 2nd order tributary to Cross Creek in Washington County, Pennsylvania. This is the only stream of this name in the United States.

Course
South Fork Cross Creek rises about 1 mile southwest of Hickory, Pennsylvania, in Washington County and then flows west-southwest to join Cross Creek about 1.5 miles southeast of Avella.

Watershed
South Fork Cross Creek drains  of area, receives about 40.0 in/year of precipitation, has a wetness index of 342.64, and is about 49% forested.

See also
List of Rivers of Pennsylvania

References

Rivers of Pennsylvania
Rivers of Washington County, Pennsylvania